Fragola may refer to:

Fragola, one of almost 50 aliases of Isabella (grape) Also Isabella grape known as "Fragola" (strawberry) in Italy.
Fragola, horse winning Critérium International horse race in 1894
Lorenzo Fragola, Italian singer-songwriter

See also
Fragolino, an Italian sparkling red wine produced in Veneto with Isabella grape